The 37th Scripps National Spelling Bee was held in Washington, D.C. at the Mayflower Hotel, on June 3–4, 1964, sponsored by the E.W. Scripps Company.

12-year-old 7th grader William Kerek, from Cuyahoga Falls, Ohio, sponsored by the Akron Beacon Journal, won the competition by correctly spelling the word "sycophant". 13-year-old 8th grader Robert Mathews of Columbus, Ohio took second place, and David Labell of Greensboro, North Carolina was third.

70 contestants participated in the competition, 43 of whom survived into the final day.

Kerek later attended the College of Wooster and Ohio State University and became a physician in the Akron area.Gray, Allison (16 August 2012). Bee Prepared, Cleveland Magazine  As of 2020, Kerek is the fifth speller from the Akron area and sponsored by the Akron Beacon Journal to win the bee, after Dean Lucas in 1927, Alma Roach in 1933, Clara Mohler in 1935, and Jean Chappelear in 1948.

References

Scripps National Spelling Bee competitions
Scripps National Spelling Bee
Scripps National Spelling Bee
Scripps National Spelling Bee